The 2010 House elections in Nevada occurred on November 2, 2010 to elect the members of the State of Nevada's delegation to the United States House of Representatives. Representatives are elected for two-year terms; the elected served in the 112th Congress from January 3, 2011 until January 3, 2013. Nevada has three seats in the House, apportioned according to the 2000 United States Census.

These elections were held concurrently with other Nevada elections, including the U.S. Senate, gubernatorial, and various other state and local elections.

Overview

By district
Results of the 2010 United States House of Representatives elections in Nevada by district:

District 1

Campaign
In this solidly liberal district based in the city of Las Vegas, incumbent Democratic Congresswoman Shelley Berkley ran for her seventh term in Congress. One of the Republicans running in the primary was future assemblywoman and Las Vegas City Council member Michele Fiore. Berkley faced Republican candidate Kenneth Wegner, her opponent from 2008, but Berkley did not face much of a challenge from Wegner. Both the Las Vegas Review-Journal and the Las Vegas Sun endorsed Berkley in her bid for re-election, with the Sun praising her as a "tireless and diligent worker for her constituents," "a champion of seniors and veterans," and "an advocate for education." In the end, Berkley won by a convincing margin, as expected.

Results

District 2

Campaign
This conservative-leaning district that constitutes all of Nevada outside of Clark County and even some parts of Clark County has been represented by Republican Congressman Dean Heller since he was first elected in 2006. Though Heller faced a close election in 2006 and a somewhat competitive election in 2008, two-time Democratic opponent Jill Derby declined to run for a third time. Instead, Nancy Price, a former regent of the Nevada System of Higher Education, emerged as the Democratic nominee. Criticizing Price’s "glowing" citations of Bernie Sanders, an openly socialist United States Senator and praising Congressman Heller’s "core principles," the Las Vegas Review-Journal endorsed Heller in his bid for a third term. On election day, Heller won by a large margin, as expected.

Results

District 3

Campaign
Facing her first bid for re-election in this marginally liberal district based in the suburbs of metropolitan Las Vegas, incumbent Democratic Congresswoman Dina Titus, the 2006 Democratic nominee for Governor, faced off against former State Senator Joe Heck. Throughout the campaign, the two candidates argued over the effectiveness of the 2009 Stimulus, how the health care reform bill would affect small businesses, and whether Democratic control of the government has helped or hurt the country.

The Las Vegas Review-Journal strongly criticized Congresswoman Titus for being "a Keynesian to the core" and for believing "government simply isn't spending enough to ensure our prospertity" and praised Republican challenger Heck for bringing "to the office the kind of perspective the House badly needs," endorsing Heck over Titus. The Sun, on the other hand, endorsed Titus, citing her "active and visible" profile and her work to "marshal federal support" to "homeowners hit hard by the economic crisis" as reasons for their endorsement.

Despite the fact that polling showed Heck with a lead over the incumbent Titus, it was a surprisingly close race, and Heck eked into Congress with less than a one percent and 1,700 vote margin of victory.

Polling

Results

References

External links
Election Center at the Nevada Secretary of State
U.S. Congress candidates for Nevada at Project Vote Smart
Nevada U.S. House from OurCampaigns.com
Campaign contributions for U.S. Congressional races in Nevada from OpenSecrets
2010 Nevada General Election graph of multiple polls from Pollster.com

House - Nevada from the Cook Political Report

Election 2010 from Vegas PBS

2010 Nevada elections
Nevada
2010